Hunter Hart (born 11 March 1897, date of death unknown) was a footballer who played for Everton in the Football League for most of the 1920s. He was born in Glasgow and played mainly as a wing half.

He started as a left-half but switched to the centre of defence before the end of his career. He was transferred from Airdrieonians for £4000 in 1922. Hart was made captain for a while  and helped the club to avoid relegation, and was at the club when they won the 1927–28 league championship. He retired just after Christmas during the 1929–30 season, when Everton were ultimately relegated.

In total he made 300 senior appearances for Everton (scoring on 5 occasions).

References

1897 births
Year of death missing
Footballers from Glasgow
English Football League players
Airdrieonians F.C. (1878) players
Everton F.C. players
Association football wing halves
Scottish Football League players
Airdrieonians F.C. (1878) managers
Scottish football managers
Scottish footballers